The 2022 Iraqi Super Cup was the 11th edition of the Iraqi Super Cup. It was held on 2 October 2022 between the 2021–22 Iraqi Premier League champions Al-Shorta and the 2021–22 Iraq FA Cup winners Al-Karkh at Al-Madina Stadium. Al-Shorta made third appearance in the Super Cup while Al-Karkh made their first appearance. Al-Shorta won the match 1–0 with a goal from Abdoul Madjid Moumouni to clinch their second Super Cup title.

Match

Details

References

External links
 Iraq Football Association

Football competitions in Iraq
Iraqi Super Cup
Iraq
2022–23 in Iraqi football